Nixya'awii Community School is a public charter school in Pendleton, Oregon, United States serving the Native American population.

Academics
In 2008, 58% of the school's seniors received their high school diploma. Of 19 students, 11 graduated, 7 dropped out, and 1 is still in high school. Of the class of 2020, 24 graduated and 5 dropped out.

References

Charter schools in Oregon
Buildings and structures in Pendleton, Oregon
High schools in Umatilla County, Oregon
Public high schools in Oregon